

Matches
Scores and results list Ireland's points tally first.

Touring party

 Tour Manager: K.E. Reid
 Team Manager: J. Davidson
 Captain: Willie Anderson

Backs

Forwards

See also

References

1989
1989
1989
1989 rugby union tours
1989–90 in Irish rugby union
1989 in Canadian rugby union
1989 in American rugby union